The 1996 Washington gubernatorial election was held on November 5, 1996. Though eligible for a second term, incumbent governor Mike Lowry chose not to run for reelection due to allegations of sexual harassment. This gubernatorial race was especially significant in that it resulted in the first Asian American governor in the mainland United States (after George Ariyoshi of island state Hawaii), Democrat Gary Locke. Former U.S. Representative Jay Inslee would be elected in the gubernatorial election in 2012.

Primary election

Candidates

Democratic
Gary Locke, King County Executive and former state representative
Norm Rice, current Mayor of Seattle
Jay Inslee, former U.S. Representative from the 4th district

Republican
Ellen Craswell, president pro tempore of the Washington Senate
Dale Foreman, majority leader of the Washington House of Representatives
Norm Maleng, King County Prosecuting Attorney
Pam Roach, state senator

Results

General election

Candidates
Gary Locke (D), King County Executive and former state representative
Ellen Craswell (R), president pro tempore of the Washington Senate

Debates 
Complete video of debate, September 26, 1996 - C-SPAN
Complete video of debate, October 9, 1996 - C-SPAN

Results

Notes

References

Gubernatorial
1996
Washington